Orfi may refer to:

People
 Amina Orfi (born 2007), Egyptian squash player
 Hocine El Orfi (born 1987), Algerian football player
 Orfi (magician), Bulgarian illusionist
 'Orfi Shirazi (1555–1591), Persian poet

Places
 Orfi, Mashhad, Iran

See also
 Urfi (disambiguation)